Felicity Wilcox (working as a film composer under the alias Felicity Fox) is an Australian composer and musician.

Accolades
Australian Film Institute Awards
Nominated. 1992 AACTA Award for Best Original Music Score for Redheads
Nominated. 2008 AACTA Award for Best Sound in a Documentary for The Oasis
Nominated. 2009 AACTA Award for Best Sound in a Documentary for The Choir
With Phil Judd, Sam Hayward, David White

ARIA Award
Nominated. 1999 ARIA Award for Best Original Soundtrack, Cast or Show Album for Afrika - Cape Town to Cairo

APRA Awards
Nominated. 1999 APRA/AGSC Award for Best Soundtrack Album for Afrika - Cape Town to Cairo
Nominated. 2003 APRA/AGSC Award for Best Documentary Soundtrack Album for A Cave In The Snow
Winner. 1997 AGSC Award Best Original Song in a Feature Film for "Fistful of Flies".

FIFREC FILM AWARD, FRANCE
Winner. 1993 BEST ORIGINAL MUSIC for 'LOYAL TO MY IMAGE'

Discography
Solo
Moment (2018) - Psychopyjama
The Curling Vine (2015)

Pluto (Felicity Fox and Gene Gill)
Rise from the Ocean (2003) - Heavy Records

Soundtrack albums
Afrika Cape Town To Cairo (1998) - BMG
The President Vs. David Hicks (2004) - Olsen-levy Prods

Concert works

Reflections (2018), for viola, cello, live interactive electronics and visualisations, for the IMMERSE Project, University of Technology Sydney and Sydney Festival 2019
SON-ombra (2018), String quartet no.1. Commissioned by Sean Botha.
Vivre Sa Vie: Composer’s Cut (2017), for flute, clarinet, percussion, piano and images, with film by Jean-Luc Godard. Commissioned by The Australia Ensemble. 
Snow (2016), trio for clarinet, cello and piano/vibraphone
Yurabirong (2016), for solo bass clarinet 
EXIT (2015), ‘animated notation’ composition for flexible ensemble, electronics and image. Commissioned by Decibel New Music Ensemble.
Uncovered Ground (2015), for large chamber ensemble. Commissioned by Ironwood and Ensemble Offspring.
Gouttes d’un Sang Etranger (2014), for viola da gamba, saxophone, electronics, spoken word, and images. Vivid Festival 2014.
Quotet (2013), for piano quartet and animations, for Australia Piano Quartet and University of Technology Sydney
Dual (2010) for soprano, alto and chamber ensemble (for Kammerklang Vox and Halcyon)

Filmography
Feature Films

Reindeer in my Saami Heart, 2016, Scandinavian Film Festival, Margaret Mead Film Festival, NYC.
I, Psychopath, 2009, ABC/ARTE/Canada TV
The Oasis, 2008, ABC, AFI nomination for Best Soundtrack
Seed Hunter, 2008, ABC/ARTE/ Canada TV
The Choir, 2007, SBS/Nat Geo, AFI nomination for Best Soundtrack, 2009
The President Vs. David Hicks, 2004, SBS
The End Of Extinction, 2000, Discovery Channel ABC
Fistful Of Flies, 1996, (AGSC Award, Best Original Song for a Feature Film,1997)
Redheads, 1992, Roxy Films, AFI nomination Best Music for a feature film
The Last Crop, 1990, ABC

TV Series

Baby Boom To Bust, SBS, 2008
About Women, SBS, 2008
Dust to Dust, ABC, 2005
Journeys to the Ends of the Earth, National Geographic Channel, ABC, 2000-2001
Afrika Cape Town to Cairo, ABC, 1998, (ARIA and AGSC/APRA nominations for Best Soundtrack Album, 1999)
The Makers, ABC, 1989

Documentaries

The Soldier, Shark Island Productions, screened Antenna Documentary Festival, Sydney, 2011
Playing With Clay, Yowie Films, screened Dendy Opera Quays, August 2010
Maverick Mother, Go Girl Productions, SBS, 2008
The Passion Of Gina Sinozich, Vagabond Films, SBS, 2008
Jabe Babe-A Heightened Life, Go Girl Productions, SBS, 2005
Selling Sickness, Paradigm Pictures, SBS, 2004
A Cave in the Snow, Firelight/Tiger Eye Productions, SBS, Nominated APRA/AGSC Best music,2003
Everyday Brave: Stranger In My Skin, Film Australia, SBS, 2002
Gulpilil, One Red Blood, Jotz Productions, ABC, 2002
Little Dove-Big Voyage, Firelight Productions, Channel 7, 2001
Breaking Bows And Arrows, Firelight/Tiger Eye Productions, SBS, 2001
Romancing the Chakra, Anna Broinowski, ABC, 1999
Up In The Sky: Tracey Moffat In New York, Jane Cole Productions, ABC, 1998
Mao’s New Suit, Singing Nomad Productions, SBS, 1997
The Golden Pig, Oracle Pictures, SBS, 1996
The Last Magician, Land Beyond Productions, SBS, 1995
Hellbento!, SBS, 1995
The Isabellas, Singing Nomad Productions, SBS, 1994
It’s Ruth!, Yowie Films, ABC, 1994
Loaded, Film Australia, SBS, 1993
Loyal To My Image, Harriet McKern, Winner, Best Music, FIFREC Film Festival, France1993
Patterns Of Landscape, Film Australia, SBS, 1988
Mum, How Do I Spell Gorbatrof?, Film Australia, SBS, 1987
The Nights Belong To The Novelist, Yowie Films, ABC, 1986
Sands of Time, Yowie Films, ABC, 1985

Short Films

Wall Boy, Shark Island Prod., Dungog Film Festival, 2009
Polly And Me, Shark Island Prod., ABC, 2008
Crocodile Dreaming, Darlene Johnson, SBS, 2006
A Once Smiling Woman, Harriet McKern, 2001
Tsunami, Anna Broinowski, St Kilda Film Festival, 2000
Vengeance, Wendy Chandler, Sydney Film Festival, 1997
Lipstick, ABC, Harriet McKern, 1994, SBS, 1996
Best Wishes, Monica Pellizzari, Venice Film Festival, 1993
'Just Desserts, Monica Pellizzari, Venice Film Festival, 1992 (Winner Baby Lion Award, 1992)Norm And Ahmed, SBS, 1988An Ordinary Woman, Sue Brooks and Alison Tilson, Sydney Film Festival, 1988

Awards and nominations
ARIA Music Awards
The ARIA Music Awards is an annual awards ceremony that recognises excellence, innovation, and achievement across all genres of Australian music. They commenced in 1987. 

! 
|-
| ARIA Music Awards of 1999
| Afrika - Cape Town to Cairo''
| [[ARIA Award for Best Original Soundtrack, Cast or Show Album|Best Original Soundtrack]
| 
| 
|-

References

External links
Official website
site

Australian film score composers
Australian women film score composers
Living people
Year of birth missing (living people)